State Road 415 (SR 415) is a north–south route in Central Florida running between State Road 44 in Volusia County and SR 46 in Seminole County.

The road continues north of State Road 44 to U.S. Route 92 (US 92) as County Road 415 (CR 415), Tomoka Farms Road.

Also SR 415 connects with the  eastern terminus of Lake Mary Boulevard at the intersection of SR 415 and SR 46.

Route description
State Road 415 begins in Seminole County at State Road 46 just east of the Orlando-Sanford International Airport and heads straight north. The only intersection of any importance within the county is CR 415(Celery Avenue), a county connecting spur which leads to downtown Sanford at US 17/92. Here the road shifts to the northeast and crosses the St. Johns River over the Osteen Bridge, where it enters Volusia County and runs through the Lake Monroe Conservation Area, which it leaves at the intersection of Reed Ellis Road. In Osteen SR 415 serves as the terminus for three separate County Roads; CR 5758, CR 4164, and CR 4162 respectively. Here, it turns straight north again until it approaches CR 4145 and then curves northeast again, as it passes through swampland and over dry creeks and canals before running through Alamana where it runs near the west side of Lake Ashby, crosses a bridge over the Lake Ashby Canal, and serves as the address for the privatetly-owned Leffler Airport.

The road turns at a slight left angle but still remains northeast as it terminates at State Road 44 east of New Smyrna Speedway in Samsula. However, it continues to run north as County Road 415(Tomoka Farms Road), which runs west of the city limits of New Smyrna Beach and Port Orange. From here, the road intersects CR 4118, serves as the western terminus of CR 421, a county extension of SR 421, passes over I-4 with no access, just before it terminates at I-95, and finally terminates at a former wye with U.S. Route 92 and CR 4068 in Daytona Beach, near the Daytona Flea and Farmers Market.

Major intersections

References

External links
 

415
415
415
0415